A black hat (black hat hacker or blackhat) is a computer hacker who usually violates laws or typical ethical standards. The term originates from 1950s westerns, when bad guys typically wore black hats and good guys white hats. Black hat hackers aim to hack into any system for their own profit or out of malice. A black hat is contrasted with a white hat. A third category is the gray hat, a person who hacks with good intentions but sometimes without permission.

Description 
Criminals who intentionally enter computer networks with malicious intent are known as "black hat hackers". They may distribute malware that steals data (particularly login credentials), financial information, or personal information (such as passwords or credit card numbers). This information is often then sold on the dark web. Malware can also be used to hold computers hostage or destroy files. Some hackers modify or destroy data in addition to stealing it. Even though hacking has become an important tool for governments to gather intelligence, black hats still tend to work alone or with organized crime groups to make easy money.

Black hat hackers can be novices or experienced criminals. They are usually knowledgeable about infiltrating computer networks and getting around security protocols. They also create malware, a form of software that lets them access computer networks, monitor their victims' online activities, or lock their victims' devices. Black hat hackers can be involved in cyber espionage or protest, in addition to pursuing personal or financial gain. For some, cybercrime may be an addictive experience.

History 

The term "black hat" comes from the color scheme used in westerns from the 1950s, in which the bad guys wore black hats, and the good guys wore white or other light colors.

One example of black hat activity was the WannaCry ransomware in May 2017. Around 400,000 computers in 150 countries were infected by it in the first two weeks of its release. Decryption tools were made available by security experts within days of WannaCry's appearance, limiting extortion payments to approximately $120,000, or slightly more than 1% of the potential haul.

The big data breaches that make headlines are the work of black hat hackers. In a data breach, hackers can steal the financial, personal, or digital information of customers, patients, and constituents. The hackers can then use this information to smear a business or government agency, sell it on the dark web, or extort money from businesses, government agencies, or individuals. The United States experienced a record number of 1,862 data breaches in 2021, according to the Identity Theft Resource Center's 2021 Data Breach Report. Data breaches have been on the rise for some time. From 2013 to 2014, black hat hackers broke into Yahoo and stole 3 billion customer records, making it possibly the largest data breach ever. In addition, the adult website Adult FriendFinder was hacked in October 2016 and over 412 million customer records were taken. A data breach that occurred between May and July of 2017 exposed more than 145 million customer records, making the national credit bureau Equifax another victim of black hat hackers.

Strategies

Concealing substance 
One of the most famous black hat methods is to utilize nasty "entryway pages," which are intended only for watchwords. Accordingly, the substance of these entryway pages is stowed away from both the clients and the web indexes. Entryway pages are designed to deceive search engines so that they cannot index or rank a website for synonymous keywords or phrases.

Keyword stuffing 
Another form of black hat search engine optimization (SEO) is known as keyword stuffing, which involves repeatedly using the same keywords to try to trick search engines. This tactic involves using irrelevant keywords on a webpage (such as on the homepage or in metadata tags) to make it appear more relevant for particular keywords, deceiving people who visit the site.

Link farming 
Link farming occurs when multiple websites or pages link to your website. This is done in order to profit from the pay-per-click (PPC) advertisements on these websites or pages. The issue is that the links only point to your website because it promises something in return, when in fact they are only there to increase traffic to another page you own and its popularity. These websites are unethical and will damage the credibility of the other pages you worked so hard on, possibly reducing your income potential.

Shrouding 
Shrouding involves showing different content to clients and web search tools. A website may present search engines with information irrelevant to the website's real content. This is done to boost the website's visibility in search results.

Spamdexing 
Spamdexing is a form of black hat SEO that involves using software to inject backlinks to a website into search engine results. This is done solely for the purpose of raising the website's ranking in search engines.

Unethical redirects 
A redirect link is considered unethical if it takes the user to a webpage different from the one indicated in the link. For instance, it is unethical to have a link that should take the user to the website "ABC", but instead takes them to "XYZ". Users are tricked into following an unintended path, even though they might not be interested in the website they land on.

Examples of famous black hats 

 Kevin Mitnick is one of the most well-known black hat hackers. At one point, he was the most wanted cybercriminal in the world. He hacked into over forty major corporations, including Motorola and IBM, and even the US National Defense warning system. He was taken into custody and incarcerated in 1995. He became a cybersecurity consultant after his release in 2001, utilizing his hacking expertise for white hat hacking.
 Vladimir Leonidovich Levin is a Russian hacker who, while working with a dial-up connection and a laptop from his Saint Petersburg apartment in 1994, accessed the accounts of several large corporate customers of Citibank, stealing USD$10.7 million. He ended up spending three years in jail. However, in 2005, an anonymous hacker group claimed responsibility for the theft, stating that they only sold Vladimir the data needed to steal the money.

Other hat types

White hat 
An ethical security hacker is referred to as a white hat or white-hat hacker. The term "ethical hacking" is meant to mean more than just penetration testing. White hat hackers aim to discover any flaws in the current system with the owner's permission. While a black hat will illegally exploit a vulnerability or instruct others on how to do so, a white hat hacker will only exploit it with permission and will not reveal its existence until it has been fixed. Teams known as "sneakers and/or hacker clubs," "red teams," or "tiger teams" are also common among white-hat hackers.

Gray hat 
A grey hat is a hacker who typically does not have malicious intent but often violate laws or common ethical standards. A vulnerability will not be illegally exploited by a grey hat, nor will it instruct others on how to do so; however, the grey hat may trade this information for personal gain. A special group of gray hats are hacktivists, who hack to promote social change.

The ideas of "white hat" and "black hat" hackers led to the use of the term "gray hat" at the end of the 1990s.

Another difference between these types of hackers is how they find vulnerabilities. The black hat will break into any system or network in order to uncover sensitive information for personal gain, whereas the white hat does so at the request of their employer or with explicit permission to determine how secure it is against hackers. The grey hat typically possesses the white hat's skills and intentions, and the black hat's disregard for permission or laws.

See also

 BlueHat
 Cybercrime
 Cyberwarfare

References

Hacking (computer security)
Cybercrime
Hat, black